Alanson Harris (April 1, 1816 – October 3, 1894) was a Canadian businessman. He was a sawmill operator and later owner of a farm implement manufacturer in Brantford, Ontario.

Alanson Harris was born in Ingersoll, Ontario in 1816 to John Harris (native of Mohawk Valley in New York State) and Catherine Jane Dygert.

Alanson Harris began his career as a manufacturer. After moving to Brantford, Ontario in the 1870s he formed A. Harris, Son and Company Limited to manufacture farm implements. Harris plant was located on Market Street South and later moved to Colborne Street.

His son John Harris was instrumental in growing the nascent company and the firm merged with rival Hart Massey's company Massey Manufacturing in 1891 to form Massey-Harris, which later became the farm machinery giant Massey Ferguson.

Alanson Harris died in 1894 and is buried at Greenwood Cemetery. Another son Elmore Harris was a well noted pastor in Toronto, his grandson Lawren Harris and great-grandson Lawren P. Harris were noted artists.

Harris facilities
 Beamsville, Ontario 1857-1881
 Brantford, Ontario
 George Street and Colborne Street East 1881
 South Market Street south of Icomm Drive (Brantford District Civic Centre) 1882-1964
 Henry Street and Wayne Gretzky Parkway (Park Road North) 1964-1988
 225 Henry Street now used by Channel Control Merchants, Ply Gem Building Products; Lowe's Home Improvement Warehouse Princess Auto and Michael's

References

1816 births
1894 deaths
Canadian manufacturing businesspeople
Canadian people of American descent
Canadian people of English descent
Canadian people of German descent
Businesspeople from Ontario
People from Ingersoll, Ontario
Tourist attractions in the County of Brant